Brion Island (French: Île Brion) is a currently uninhabited island in the Magdalen Islands archipelago in the middle of the Gulf of Saint Lawrence and part of the municipality of Grosse-Île, Gaspésie–Îles-de-la-Madeleine, Quebec, Canada. It is the most northeast of the islands in the Magdalen archipelago, apart from the Bird Rocks (Rochers aux Oiseaux) twenty kilometres (12 miles) east-north-east.

History
Passing by the island in 1534, Jacques Cartier erected his second cross and named the island ille de Bryon after his principal expeditionary patron Philippe de Chabot, Seigneur de Brion and Admiral of France.

Geography
Haldimand Cliff (Falaise Haldimand), named for Frederick Haldimand, is on the southeast coast of the island.

Natural history
Almost the entire island is encompassed by the Réserve écologique de l'Île-Brion. The Bird Rocks Federal Migratory Bird Sanctuary encompasses several small islands to the northwest of Brion Island.

References

External links 
 The Bird Rocks Migratory Bird Sanctuary, Environment Canada

Landforms of Gaspésie–Îles-de-la-Madeleine
Magdalen Islands
Protected areas of Gaspésie–Îles-de-la-Madeleine
Canada geography articles needing translation from French Wikipedia